The Rt Hon. William Wentworth FitzWilliam Dick (28 October 1805 – 15 September 1892), known as William Wentworth FitzWilliam Hume until 1864, was an Irish Conservative politician.

He was elected as one of the two Members of Parliament (MPs) for Wicklow in 1852 and held the seat until 1880, when he was defeated. In 1890 he was appointed to the Privy Council of Ireland.

Personal life 
Dick was the son of William Hoare Hume and Charlotte Anna Dick. He married Margaret Bruce Chaloner, daughter of Robert Chaloner and Frances Laura Dundas in 1829.

However, this marriage ended for an unknown reason, and he remarried to Ellen (or Helen) Crookshank, daughter of George Crookshank, around 1860.

References

External links
 

1805 births
1892 deaths
Irish Conservative Party MPs
Hume family
Members of the Parliament of the United Kingdom for County Wicklow constituencies (1801–1922)
Members of the Privy Council of Ireland
UK MPs 1852–1857
UK MPs 1857–1859
UK MPs 1859–1865
UK MPs 1865–1868
UK MPs 1868–1874
UK MPs 1874–1880